The 2018–19 season was Macclesfield Town's first season back in League Two after gaining promotion the season before.

Competitions

Pre-season friendlies

League Two

League table

Results summary

Results by matchday

Matches
On 21 June 2018, the League Two fixtures for the forthcoming season were announced.

FA Cup

The first round draw was made live on BBC by Dennis Wise and Dion Dublin on 22 October.

EFL Cup

On 15 June 2018, the draw for the first round was made in Vietnam. The second round draw was made from the Stadium of Light on 16 August. The third round draw was made on 30 August 2018 by David Seaman and Joleon Lescott.

EFL Trophy
On 13 July 2018, the initial group stage draw bar the U21 invited clubs was announced. The draw for the second round was made live on Talksport by Leon Britton and Steve Claridge on 16 November.

Transfers

Transfers in

Transfers out

Loans in

Loans out

References

Macclesfield Town F.C. seasons
Macclesfield Town